Ribet's theorem (earlier called the epsilon conjecture or ε-conjecture) is part of number theory. It concerns properties of Galois representations associated with modular forms. It was proposed by Jean-Pierre Serre and proven by Ken Ribet. The proof was a significant step towards the proof of Fermat's Last Theorem (FLT). As shown by Serre and Ribet, the Taniyama–Shimura conjecture (whose status was unresolved at the time) and the epsilon conjecture together imply that FLT is true.

In mathematical terms, Ribet's theorem shows that if the Galois representation associated with an elliptic curve has certain properties, then that curve cannot be modular (in the sense that there cannot exist a modular form that gives rise to the same representation).

Statement 

Then there exists a weight 2 newform  of level  such that

Then Ribet's theorem implies that there exists a weight 2 newform  of level  such that .

Level lowering 

Ribet's theorem states that beginning with an elliptic curve  of conductor  does not guarantee the existence of an elliptic curve  of level  such that . The newform  of level  may not have rational Fourier coefficients, and hence may be associated to a higher-dimensional abelian variety, not an elliptic curve. For example, elliptic curve 4171a1 in the Cremona database given by the equation

with conductor  and discriminant  does not level-lower mod 7 to an elliptic curve of conductor 97. Rather, the mod  Galois representation is isomorphic to the mod  Galois representation of an irrational newform  of level 97.

However, for  large enough compared to the level  of the level-lowered newform, a rational newform (e.g. an elliptic curve) must level-lower to another rational newform (e.g. elliptic curve).

Similarly, the Frey-Mazur conjecture predicts that for large enough  (independent of the conductor ), elliptic curves with isomorphic mod  Galois representations are in fact isogenous, and hence have the same conductor. Thus non-trivial level-lowering between rational newforms is not predicted to occur for large .

History 
In his thesis,  originated the idea of associating solutions (a,b,c) of Fermat's equation with a different mathematical object: an elliptic curve. If p is an odd prime and a, b, and c are positive integers such that

then a corresponding Frey curve is an algebraic curve given by the equation

In 1982 Gerhard Frey called attention to the unusual properties of the same curve, now called a Frey curve. This provided a bridge between Fermat and Taniyama by showing that a counterexample to FLT would create a curve that would not be modular. The conjecture attracted considerable interest when Frey suggested that the Taniyama–Shimura–Weil conjecture implies FLT. However, his argument was not complete. In 1985 Jean-Pierre Serre proposed that a Frey curve could not be modular and provided a partial proof. This showed that a proof of the semistable case of the Taniyama–Shimura conjecture would imply FLT. Serre did not provide a complete proof and the missing bit became known as the epsilon conjecture or ε-conjecture. In the summer of 1986, Kenneth Alan Ribet proved the epsilon conjecture, thereby proving that the Taniyama–Shimura–Weil conjecture implied FLT.

Implications 
Suppose that the Fermat equation with exponent  had a solution in non-zero integers . Since all odd primes dividing  in  appear to a  power in the minimal discriminant , by Ribet's theorem repetitive level descent modulo  strips all odd primes from the conductor.

See also 
 ABC conjecture
 Wiles' proof of Fermat's Last Theorem

Notes

References 

 Kenneth Ribet, From the Taniyama-Shimura conjecture to Fermat's last theorem. Annales de la faculté des sciences de Toulouse Sér. 5, 11 no. 1 (1990), p. 116–139.
 
 
 Frey Curve and Ribet's Theorem

External links 
Ken Ribet and Fermat's Last Theorem by Kevin Buzzard June 28, 2008

Algebraic curves
Riemann surfaces
Modular forms
Theorems in number theory
Theorems in algebraic geometry
Fermat's Last Theorem